The A 31 road is an A-Grade trunk road in Sri Lanka. It connects Ampara with Karaitivu.

The A 31 passes through Sammanthurai to reach Karaitivu.

References

Highways in Sri Lanka
Transport in Eastern Province, Sri Lanka